The 1931 Kentucky gubernatorial election was held on November 3, 1931. Democratic nominee Ruby Laffoon defeated Republican nominee William B. Harrison with 54.28% of the vote.

General election

Candidates
Major party candidates
Ruby Laffoon, Democratic
William B. Harrison, Republican 

Other candidates
John J. Thobe, Socialist
Herman Horning, Socialist Labor

Results

References

1931
Kentucky
1931 Kentucky elections